Countdown is an Armenian psychological thriller, drama television series developed by Yelena Arshakyan. The series premiered on Armenia Premium on October 21, 2017. Since then, the series has been airing on Saturdays and Sundays at 21:00. The  cinematographer of the series is Nelson Sargsyan.
The series takes place in various places of Armenia.

References

External links

Armenian drama television series
Armenian-language television shows
Armenia TV original programming
2017 Armenian television series debuts
2010s Armenian television series